Northern Negros State College of Science and Technology, abbreviated as NONESCOST, is a state college in Sagay, Negros Occidental, Philippines.

History
The college started as a satellite campus of Iloilo State College of Fisheries until it was separated into an independent college and renamed as Northern Negros State College of Science and Technology. It was created in 1998, by Republic Act 8448 by then-Congressman Alfredo G. Marañon Jr.

General mandate
The college is mandated to provide higher technological, professional and vocational instruction and training in science, fishery, forestry, agriculture, engineering and industrial fields, as well as short-term technical or vocational courses. It is also mandated to promote research, advanced studies, extension work and progressive leadership in its areas of specialization.

Campuses

Main campus
 Sagay City

Satellite campuses
 Cadiz, Negros Occidental
 Calatrava, Negros Occidental
 Escalante, Negros Occidental

References

 http://www.chanrobles.com/republicacts/republicactno8448.html

External links
 

State universities and colleges in the Philippines
Universities and colleges in Negros Occidental